Diodora is a genus of small to medium-sized keyhole limpet in the family Fissurellidae.

Life habits
Like all other fissurellids, Diodora species are herbivores, and use the radula to scrape algae from rocks. An exception is D. apertura, which grazes on sponges such as Hymeniacidon.

Water for respiration and excretion is drawn in under the edge of the shell and exits through the "keyhole" at or near the apex.

Species
Species in this genus include:

 Diodora aguayoi Pérez Farfante, 1943
 Diodora alta (Adams, 1852)
 Diodora arcuata (Sowerby, 1862)
 Diodora arnoldi McLean, 1966
 Diodora aspera (Rathke, 1833) 
 Diodora australis (Krauss, 1848)
 Diodora benguelensis (Dunker, 1846)
 Diodora bermudensis (Dall & Bartsch, 1911)
 Diodora bollonsi (Oliver, 1915) 
 Diodora calyculata (Sowerby, 1823)
 Diodora canariensis Verstraeten & Naef, 2007
 Diodora candida (Sowerby, 1835)
 Diodora cayenensis (Lamarck, 1822)
 Diodora corbicula (Sowerby, 1862) 
 Diodora cruciata (Gould, 1846)
 Diodora crucifera Pilsbry, 1890
 Diodora delicata (Smith, 1899)
 Diodora demartiniorum Buzzurro & Russo, 2004
 Diodora digueti (Mabille, 1895)
 Diodora dorsata (Monterosato, 1878)
 Diodora dysoni (Reeve, 1850)
 Diodora edwardsi (Dautzenberg & H. Fischer, 1896)
 Diodora elevata (Dunker, 1846)
 Diodora elizabethae (Smith, 1901) 
 Diodora fargoi Olsson & McGinty, 1958
 Diodora fluviana (Dall, 1889)
 Diodora fontainiana (d'Orbigny, 1841)
 Diodora fragilis Pérez Farfante & Henríquez, 1947
 Diodora funiculata (Reeve, 1850)
 Diodora fuscocrenulata (Smith, 1906) érez Farfante
 Diodora galeata (Helbing, 1779)
 Diodora giannispadai Aissaoui, Puillandre & Bouchet, 2017
 Diodora gibberula (Lamarck, 1822) 
 Diodora graeca (Linnaeus, 1758)
 Diodora granifera (Pease, 1861)
 Diodora harrassowitzi (Ihering, 1927)
 Diodora inaequalis (Sowerby, 1835)
 Diodora italica (DeFrance, 1820)
 Diodora jaumei Aguayo & Rehder, 1936
 Diodora jukesii (Reeve, 1850) 
 Diodora levicostata (Smith, 1914)
 Diodora lima (Sowerby, 1862)
 Diodora lincolnensis (Cotton, 1930)
 Diodora lineata (Sowerby, 1835)
 Diodora listeri (d'Orbigny, 1847)
 Diodora lorenzi Cossignani, 2020
 Diodora magnifica Poppe & Tagaro, 2020
 Diodora menkeana (Dunker, 1846)
 Diodora meta  (Ihering, 1927)
 Diodora minuta (Lamarck, 1822)
 Diodora mirifica Métivier, 1972
 Diodora namibiensis Poppe, Tagaro & Sarino, 2011
 Diodora occidua (Cotton, 1930) 
 Diodora occultata Poppe & Tagaro, 2020
 Diodora octagona (Reeve, 1850)
 Diodora panamensis (Sowerby, 1835)
 Diodora parviforata (Sowerby, 1889)
 Diodora patagonica (d'Orbigny, 1839)
 Diodora philippiana (Dunker, 1846) 
 Diodora pica (Sowerby, 1835)
 Diodora producta (Monterosato, 1880)
 Diodora punctifissa McLean, 1970
 Diodora pusilla Berry, 1959
 Diodora quadriradiata (Reeve, 1850) 
 Diodora ruppellii (Sowerby, 1835) 
 † Diodora sancticlementensis Landau, Van Dingenen & Ceulemans, 2017 
 Diodora sarasuae Espinosa, 1984
 Diodora saturnalis (Carpenter, 1864)
 Diodora sayi (Dall, 1889)
 Diodora sculptilis Rolán & Gori, 2011
 Diodora serae Espinosa & Ortea, 2011
 Diodora sieboldii (Reeve, 1850)
 Diodora singaporensis (Reeve, 1850) 
 Diodora spreta (Smith, 1901)
 † Diodora stalennuyi Dell'Angelo, Sosso, O. Anistratenko & V. Anistratenko, 2017 
 Diodora tanneri (Verrill, 1882)
 Diodora tenuiclathrata (Seguenza, 1863)
 Diodora terezae Neves, Castillo & Ramil, 2019
 Diodora ticaonica (Reeve, 1850) 
 Diodora variegata (Sowerby, 1862)
 Diodora vetula (Woodring, 1928)
 Diodora viridula (Lamarck, 1822)
 Diodora wetmorei Pérez Farfante, 1945 

Synonyms:
 Diodora fimbriata Reeve, 1850 : synonym of Diodora jukesii (Reeve, 1850)
 Diodora natalensis ((Krauss, 1848), 1848): synonym of Fissurella natalensis Krauss, 1848
 Diodora nigropunctata Thiele, 1930: synonym of  Diodora jukesii (Reeve, 1850)
 Diodora noachina (Linnaeus, 1771): synonym of Puncturella noachina (Linnaeus, 1771)
 Diodora octogona [sic]: synonym of Diodora octagona (Reeve, 1850)
 Diodora ovalis Thiele, 1930: synonym of  Diodora singaporensis (Reeve, 1850)
 Diodora philippiana (Finlay, 1930): synonym of Lucapina philippiana (Finlay, 1930)
 Diodora plicifera Thiele, 1930: synonym of Diodora jukesii (Reeve, 1850)
 Diodora reevei Schepman, 1908: synonym of Diodora octagona (Reeve, 1850)
 Diodora ruppellii (G.B. Sowerby I, 1835): synonym of Diodora rueppellii (G.B. Sowerby I, 1835)
 Diodora rugosa Thiele, 1930: synonym of  Diodora lineata (G.B. Sowerby I, 1835)

Further species include 
 Diodora alternata Say, 1822
 Diodora beebei (Hertlein and Strong, 1951)
 Diodora bombayana Sowerby, 1862
 Diodora carditella Dall
 Diodora crenifera (Sowerby, 1835)
 Diodora densiclathrata McLean, 1966
 Diodora elaborata Sowerby
 Diodora fusilla S. S. Berry, 1959 (or Diodora pusilla Berry, 1959 ?)
 Diodora habanensis Christiaens, 1975
 Diodora murina Arnold, 1903
 Diodora mus (Reeve, 1850)
 Diodora nucula (Dall)
 Diodora semilunata (Habe, 1953)
 Diodora suprapunicea (Otuka, 1937)
 Diodora tenebrosa Conrad
 Diodora vola Reeve

References

 Gray, J.E. 1821. A natural arrangement of Mollusca according to their internal structure. London Medical Repository 15: 229-239 
 Swainson, W. 1840. A Treatise on Malacology or the Natural Classification of Shells and Shell-fish. London : Longman, Brown, Green & Longmans 419 pp.
 Gray, J.E. 1847. A list of the Genera of Recent Mollusca, their Synonyms and Types. Proceedings of the Zoological Society of London 15: 129-242
 Gray, J.E. 1857. Guide to the Systematic Distribution of the Mollusca in the British Museum. London : British Museum Trustees 230 pp.
 Carpenter, P.P. 1857. Catalogue of the collection of Mazatlan shells in the British Museum collected by Frederik Reigen. London : British Museum pp. i-xii, 1-552. [220] 
 Iredale, T. 1924. Results from Roy Bell's molluscan collections. Proceedings of the Linnean Society of New South Wales 49(3): 179-279, pls 33-36
 Finlay, H.J. 1926. A further commentary on New Zealand molluscan systematics. Transactions of the New Zealand Institute 57: 320-485 pls 18-23 
 Cotton, B.C. & Godfrey, F.K. 1934. South Australian Shells. Part 10. South Australian Naturalist 15(2): 41-56
 Moore, R.C. (ed.) 1960. Treatise on Invertebrate Paleontology. Part I. Mollusca 1. Boulder, Colorado & Lawrence, Kansas : Geological Society of America & University of Kansas Press xxiii + 351 pp.
 Vaught, K.C. (1989). A classification of the living Mollusca. American Malacologists: Melbourne, FL (USA). . XII, 195 pp.
 Wilson, B. 1993. Australian Marine Shells. Prosobranch Gastropods. Kallaroo, Western Australia : Odyssey Publishing Vol. 1 408 pp.
 Gofas, S.; Le Renard, J.; Bouchet, P. (2001). Mollusca, in: Costello, M.J. et al. (Ed.) (2001). European register of marine species: a check-list of the marine species in Europe and a bibliography of guides to their identification. Collection Patrimoines Naturels, 50: pp. 180–213
 Aktipis, S.W., Boehm, E. & Giribet, G. 2011. Another step towards understanding the slit-limpets (Fissurellidae, Fissurelloidea, Vetigastropoda, Gastropoda): a combined five-gene molecular phylogeny. Zoologica Scripta 40(3): 238-259

External links 
  Australian Faunal Directory
 McLean J.H. & Geiger D.L. (1998). New genera and species having the Fissurisepta shell form, with a generic-level phylogenetic analysis (Gastropoda: Fissurellidae). Contributions in Science, Natural History Museum of Los Angeles County, 475: 1-32
  Serge GOFAS, Ángel A. LUQUE, Joan Daniel OLIVER,José TEMPLADO & Alberto SERRA (2021) - The Mollusca of Galicia Bank (NE Atlantic Ocean); European Journal of Taxonomy 785: 1–114

Fissurellidae

it:Diodora